A Kuma (كمة) is a rounded Omani cap traditionally worn by men. It is flat on the top with the rim folded inwards, and is often white decorated with various ornate colourful designs. It is specially sized (as opposed to one size fits all) and has small holes throughout the embroidery which help keep the head cool in the hot Omani sun. It is frequently worn as day-to-day attire due to the sultan’s work to maintain the nations cultural heritage, and as such people not only wear these traditional garments often, but are incredibly proud of them and the patriotism they represent. The Kuma is believed to originate in Zanzibar, a former colony of Oman, and is related to the East African Kofia. It is sometimes worn with a massar on top of it, to give the massar structure. It is also worn In Gwadar, Pakistan, a former overseas possession of Oman.

References

Hats